The Church of Blessed Virgin Mary of Mount Carmel is a church located in Diocese of Rome, Torrino Area, locality of Mostacciano in Beata Maria Virgine del Carmelo Piazza.

Pope John Paul II instituted it as the seat of cardinal title of Beatæ Mariæ Virginis de Monte Carmelo in Mostacciano.

List of Cardinal Protectors
 John Baptist Wu Cheng-chung 28 June 1988 – 23 September 2002
 Anthony Okogie 21 October 2003 – present

References

External links
 Santa Maria del Monte Carmelo 

Titular churches
Rome Q. XXIV Don Bosco